Singen is the second largest district of the municipality of Remchingen in the Enzkreis district in Baden-Württemberg, Germany.

Geography 
Singen is the northernmost district of Remchingen, its settlement area lies predominantly on the right side of the Pfinz running north-northwest there, which is joined by the Kämpfelbach from the east in the area of the village. There is a weir and a water mill on the river. The district's territory extends far to the southwest across the Pfinz and includes the large forest Buchwald and even further to the north-northeast into the forest Hegenach.

Singen borders in the south on the settlement area of Wilferdingen, which lies for the most part beyond the Pfinztal railroad, which runs from the Kämpfelbachtal into the lower Pfinztal. The Bundesstraße 10 on the left bank of the Pfin River connects Singen with Pforzheim in the southeast and Karlsruhe in the northwest. The town lies on the Bertha Benz Memorial Route.

Singen borders the communities of Pfinztal to the northwest, Königsbach-Stein to the east, Nöttingen and Karlsbad to the southwest.

History 
Singen merged with Wilferdingen on January 1, 1973, to form the municipality of Remchingen. The Enzkreis in its current form also came into being on this day.

Transportation 
The railroad station of Singen forms the local border to Wilferdingen. The station Wilferdingen-Singen connects Singen with Wilferdingen through an underpass. From the station you can reach Karlsruhe, Pforzheim and Stuttgart, among others. Light rail trains, the Interregio-Express and the Regional-Express stop here.

Education 
In Singen there is a Werkrealschule, an elementary school and a high school.

References

External links 

 Site on remchingen.de

Villages in Baden-Württemberg
Remchingen